Granny Goodness is a fictional supervillain and New God published by DC Comics.

Publication history
Modeled after Phyllis Diller, Granny Goodness first appeared in Mister Miracle #2 (May 1971) and was created by Jack Kirby.

Fictional character biography
Granny Goodness did not begin as one of the higher-level residents of Apokolips, but was instead one of the "Lowlies"–the brutally oppressed peasant class. She was removed from her parents and trained to be one of Darkseid's "Hounds" (his elite soldiers). One part of their training was to train their dog; Goodness named hers Mercy. Through combat and training, the two bonded. As the final step of her initiation into life as a Hound, she was told to kill her beloved pet. Instead, she killed her trainer for ordering this. When Darkseid asked why, she answered that "to have done otherwise would have robbed my lord of a most valuable asset", telling him that Mercy would obey her first, but him foremost. Testing this, Darkseid ordered Mercy to kill Goodness. Mercy attacked Goodness, forcing Goodness to kill her pet. Darkseid was impressed, telling Goodness that she had graduated with honors. "You have trained Mercy so well in my name that perhaps you'll do as well training others whose blind obedience I will one day require".

Darkseid had Goodness run the training facility for his elite soldiers, where she used brainwashing and torture, in a brutal parody of child care, to turn the innocent into fanatical warriors willing to kill or die for Darkseid's glory. Since the war between Apokolips and New Genesis first moved to Earth, Granny Goodness has often run Earthly orphanages, looking for potential warriors for Darkseid.

Granny runs the "orphanage" on Apokolips and is the chief of the Female Furies. She also raised Scott Free, the son of Highfather of New Genesis who had been traded for Darkseid's son as part of a peace treaty. Scott Free (AKA Mister Miracle) became the first child to successfully escape one of her Orphanages.

In the final issue of the Amazons Attack miniseries it was revealed that Granny Goodness has been posing as Athena, having manipulated the Amazons into the war. She tells Hippolyta that it was a test which the Amazons failed. It also appears that Goodness is posing as Athena in the Countdown series, using Amazon centers to recruit new female fighters. She is also holding the Gods of Olympus prisoner. After the gods are freed by Mary Marvel, Holly Robinson and Harley Quinn from an Apokolitian chamber, Granny is attacked and killed by Infinity-Man.

However, she is reincarnated on Earth, along with the other Evil Gods, as a member of Boss Dark Side's gang. Although this form is destroyed by Black Alice in an issue of Birds of Prey, in the "Final Crisis" storyline, she takes the body of the Alpha Lantern known as Kraken and uses it to attack John Stewart and frame Hal Jordan for the assault. While she is discovered by Batman, she easily overpowers him and brings him back to the Evil Factory beneath Blüdhaven where he is sealed inside a torture device. Later, Reverend Good announces that Granny Goodness is poised to conquer Oa from within in the name of Darkseid, which would likely reestablish her as his favorite among the Elite.

Granny's attempted assault on the power structure of Oa results in injury to a Guardian, the clearing of Hal Jordan's name, the hiding of the Power Battery and a Green Lantern assault force sent to Earth. After she is stopped by Hal Jordan, she is taken away to be inspected. Her fate after "Final Crisis" is left unknown.

Powers and abilities
Granny Goodness is functionally immortal, has superhuman strength and endurance. She is surprisingly robust considering her age: she can still lift several tons with ease and she is resistant to most forms of physical attack. Also she is quite good at hand-to-hand combat. In her youth, she was one of the best and most loyal warriors in the service of Darkseid. As a member of Darkseid's elite, Granny Goodness has access to highly advanced weaponry; in combat she usually wields a mega-rod. In addition, she is a great leader and military strategist that commands soldiers being trained at her orphanages, including flight troops, who ride on flying aero-discs; armored infantry; and members of the special powers force, who wield deadly weapons and who, in many cases, possess super powers. Among her most relevant pupils are Mister Miracle, Big Barda, Kanto, Virman Vundabar and the Female Furies.

Reception
Granny Goodness has been described as a symbol of the "monstrous feminine" who "violates traditional paradigms of motherhood and femininity" through her wickedness, as opposed to more traditional, nurturing depictions of motherhood in fiction.

Other versions
She is seen in the pages of Justice League, in the Rock of Ages storyline, in an alternate future where Darkseid has conquered the Earth. She has merged with the Mother Box systems, making a giant Grandmother Box. As her main offensive weapon, she teleports and blasts firepits energy at her adversaries. Ultimately, she is destroyed by the future Wonder Woman who sacrifices her own life in the battle.

In Grant Morrison's Seven Soldiers, after Darkseid's victory over New Genesis destroyed both planets, Granny reinvented herself. She is now a brothel madame, with the Furies as her prostitutes, and is an obese black woman. In this guise she hoped to seduce the new Mister Miracle to Darkseid. An identical version of Granny appears in Birds of Prey #118 (following Countdown), working at the "Dark Side Club".

In Amalgam Comics, Goodness was fused with Marvel Comics' Agatha Harkness to become Granny Harkness, follower of Thanoseid (Thanos + Darkseid).

In other media

Television
 Granny Goodness appears in Superman: The Animated Series, voiced by Ed Asner.
 Granny Goodness appears in the Justice League Unlimited episode "The Ties That Bind", voiced again by Asner.
 Granny Goodness makes a cameo appearance in the Legion of Super Heroes episode "Unnatural Alliances". She was seen in Imperiex's "bedtime story" where he tells a young Abel (who would later grow up to help create Imperiex) about his origin in the future.
 Granny Goodness appears in Smallville. In the ninth season finale "Salvation", a mysterious elderly woman appears, whom the credits list as Granny Goodness, portrayed by Nancy Amelia Bell. The character reappears in the tenth season, portrayed by Christine Willes. 
 Granny Goodness appears in DC Super Hero Girls, voiced by April Stewart. She appears as Super Hero High's librarian. In the television special DC Super Hero Girls: Super Hero High, she summons the Female Furies through a Boom Tube to help take over the school in an attempt to allow Darkseid to conquer Earth. Granny is eventually defeated alongside the Furies and sent to Belle Reve.
 Granny Goodness appears in the Justice League Action episode "Superman's Pal, Sid Sharp", voiced by Cloris Leachman. 
 Granny Goodness appears in Young Justice, voiced by Deborah Strang. Under the name Gretchen Goode, her company sells VR goggles used to test children for the meta gene. If the child tests positive, they are then trafficked for Darkseid.
 Granny Goodness appears in the Harley Quinn episode "Inner (Para) Demons", voiced by Jessica Walter. When Harley Quinn and her crew arrive on Apokolips to obtain a Parademon army to combat the GCPD, Granny engages the former in a fight, only to be killed by Doctor Psycho.

Film
 Granny Goodness appears in Superman/Batman: Apocalypse, voiced by Ed Asner.
 An alternate universe version of Granny Goodness appears in Justice League: Gods and Monsters, voiced by Khary Payton.
 Granny Goodness appears in DC Super Hero Girls: Intergalactic Games, voiced by April Stewart.
 Granny Goodness appears in Zack Snyder's Justice League, portrayed by an unspecified actress.

Video games
 Granny Goodness appears in DC Universe Online, voiced by Lainie Frasier. She appears alongside other New Gods to aid Darkseid's plans.
 Granny Goodness appears as a boss and unlockable playable character in Lego DC Super-Villains, voiced by Diane Delano. She is one of the bosses in the 12th level of the game, "The One With the T-rex Mech", as when Wonder Woman, Harley Quinn and Cyborg head to Themyscira, she had already mind controlled the Amazonian warriors there, and is then fought in the coliseum alongside Virman Vundabar, but are defeated.
Granny Goodness appears as a support card in the mobile version of Injustice: Gods Among Us.

References

External links
 DCU Guide: Granny Goodness

Characters created by Jack Kirby
Comics characters introduced in 1971
DC Comics characters with superhuman strength
DC Comics deities
DC Comics female supervillains
New Gods of Apokolips
Fourth World (comics)
Superman characters